The Formula is a 1980 mystery film directed by John G. Avildsen. It was produced and written by Steve Shagan, who adapted his own 1979 novel The Formula. It stars Marlon Brando, George C. Scott, Marthe Keller, John Gielgud, G. D. Spradlin, and Beatrice Straight.

The film follows the attempts by different groups who wish to either secure or destroy a synthetic fuel formula invented by the Nazis at the end of World War II which would end reliance on the supply of oil.

Plot
The film opens in the final days of World War II as Soviet forces close in on the outskirts of Berlin. Panzer Korps General Helmut Kladen (Richard Lynch) is dispatched to the Swiss frontier with top secret documents to be used as a bargaining chip with the Allies to save Germany from the Soviets. He is subsequently intercepted by the U.S. Army and turned over to Army Intelligence.

In contemporary Los Angeles, Lt. Barney Caine (George C. Scott) is assigned to solve the murder of his former boss and friend Tom Neeley, which presumably occurred during a drug deal gone wrong. However, Neeley has written "Gene" on a newspaper in his own blood, and Caine finds a map of Germany with the name "Obermann" on it. Caine is surprised to learn that Neeley provided drugs at parties hosted by the tycoon Adam Steiffel (Marlon Brando). When he interviews Neeley's ex-wife (Beatrice Straight), he quickly catches her in several lies, and when he returns to interview her a second time, he finds her shot dead in her hot tub.

Steiffel reveals in his interview that Neeley was working for him as a bagman. Neeley was sent overseas by the company to deliver money to business partners. Caine becomes convinced he must go to Germany to solve Neeley's murder, he convinces his Chief (Alan North) to allow him to go to Germany to continue the investigation. Later, the Chief is seen phoning one of Steiffel's cronies (G. D. Spradlin) to tell him that Caine has taken the bait.

Once in Berlin, Caine meets Paul Obermann (David Byrd) at the Berlin Zoo. Obermann explains operation "Genesis" - a synthetic fuel formula that the Nazis had produced (and could wreck the current oil-economy). This confirms Caine's hunch that Neeley was killed over Genesis. Obermann is then murdered outside the zoo. At his apartment, his niece Lisa (Marthe Keller) shows up to be interviewed by the police. At Obermann's memorial service, Caine asks Lisa to accompany him to act as his interpreter. Lisa agrees and they follow up on a lead that Obermann gave him regarding Professor Siebold who worked on the formula.

During their interview with Siebold (Ferdy Mayne), he reveals that the inventor of the formula, Dr. Abraham Esau (John Gielgud), is still alive. After they leave his apartment, Siebold is shot in the head through a window. When they meet up with Esau, he writes down the formula for Caine, after he makes Caine promise to make it public. Lisa and Caine make photocopies and send them to the LAPD and a Swiss energy company. Caine also hides two copies from Lisa, depositing them in the hotel's safe. Subsequently, he reveals that he has deduced that she is not Obermann's niece at all, but a spy sent to keep tabs on him. Lisa admits it, but claims she didn't sleep with him because of her orders.

At the border with East Berlin, Caine confronts Tadesco who relates how he knew Neeley, and what transpired after his capture by the Americans. As Tadesco walks towards his car, Lisa kills Tadesco, then walks towards East Berlin. At the airport before flying home to Los Angeles, Caine realizes the two copies of the formula in the hotel safe were replaced with fakes by Lisa, and that the only real copies are with the LAPD and the Swiss.

After landing in Los Angeles, he heads straight to Steiffel's office. Steiffel has kidnapped Caine's partner (Yosuta) and is holding him to exchange for the copy of the formula.

After exchanging the formula for Yosuta's release, Caine demands answers from Steiffel. Steiffel then outlines the cartel's plan since the end of the war, to keep the formula secret. They had been able to keep it secret until Swiss businessman, Tauber, began searching for the members of the original Genesis team, in the hope the team could recreate the formula.  Tauber's actions made the members of the Genesis team a liability to the cartel, so Steiffel had pulled strings to get Caine sent on a trip to Germany, which would serve as a cover for the cartel's plot to eliminate the remaining members.

Just before leaving, Caine reveals that he sent the formula to Tauber.

After their meeting, Steiffel makes a phone call to Tauber, asking him to keep the formula secret for another 10 years in exchange for a 25% share of his anthracite holdings. They negotiate briefly, and Tauber agrees to not use the formula for 10 years.

Cast

Production 
The Formula was partly filmed at the Spandau Studios in Berlin, with location shooting in St. Moritz and Hamburg. The remainder of the film was shot at the Metro-Goldwyn-Mayer studios in Culver City, California.

Reception

Critical response 
On review aggregator Rotten Tomatoes, the film holds a 30% rating based on 10 reviews. TV Guide says- "Dull, contrived, and ploddingly directed by John G. Avildsen, this film is a never-ending series of repetitive interviews in which Barney asks questions of a recalcitrant informant. Ultimately, the trail leads back to Brando's corpulent oil magnate. Brando, who appears in only three scenes and walked off with $3 million for his performance, is the only spark of life in the entire film, albeit a highly bizarre one".

Awards and nominations

References

External links 
 
 
 

1980 films
1980s crime thriller films
American crime thriller films
American mystery thriller films
American political thriller films
Films scored by Bill Conti
Films based on American novels
Films directed by John G. Avildsen
Films set in Berlin
Films set in West Germany
Films shot at Spandau Studios
Metro-Goldwyn-Mayer films
American police detective films
Peak oil films
Films set in 1945
Films set in 1980
Films set in Los Angeles
West German films
German mystery thriller films
English-language German films
German crime thriller films
Films shot in Hamburg
Films shot in Berlin
1980s English-language films
1980s American films
1980s German films